Buies Creek is a census-designated place (CDP) located in the Neills Creek Township of Harnett County, North Carolina, United States. It is the home of Campbell University. The population was 2,942 at the 2010 census, up from 2,215 in 2000. Buies Creek is a part of the Dunn Micropolitan Area, which is also a part of the greater Raleigh–Durham–Cary Combined Statistical Area (CSA) as defined by the United States Census Bureau.

History
The James Archibald Campbell House was listed on the National Register of Historic Places in 1977.

Incorporation
The wooded hamlet of Buies Creek was incorporated by the North Carolina General Assembly in 1914. The town charter was repealed in 1967.

Geography
U.S. Route 421 passes through the community, connecting the two nearby towns.

Buies Creek, a tributary of the Cape Fear River, drains the town of Buies Creek.

Demographics

2020 census

As of the 2020 United States census, there were 3,253 people, 531 households, and 107 families residing in the CDP.

2010 census
At the 2010 census there were 2,942 people, 577 households, and 232 families living in the CDP. The population density was 1,296.0 people per square mile (500.3/km). There were 699 housing units at an average density of 307.9 per square mile (118.9/km). The racial makeup of the CDP was 78.3% White, 14.8% African American, 0.7% Native American, 2.2% Asian, 0.0% Pacific Islander, 1.9% from other races, and 2.2% from two or more races. Hispanic or Latino of any race were 3.6%.

Of the 577 households 15.1% had children under the age of 18 living with them, 29.6% were married couples living together, 7.8% had a female householder with no husband present, and 59.8% were non-families. 36.6% of households were one person and 9.7% were one person aged 65 or older. The average household size was 2.07 and the average family size was 2.73.

The age distribution was 4.3% under the age of 14, 32.4% from 15 to 19, 42.0% from 20 to 24, 9.0% from 25 to 44, 7.9% from 45 to 64, and 4.5% 65 or older. The median age was 21 years. For every 100 females, there were 80.7 males. For every 100 females age 18 and over, there were 80.1 males.

As of the 2014 American Community Survey (ACS), the median household income was $31,959, and the median family income  was $51,106. Males had a median income of $9,625 versus $11,908 for females. The per capita income for the CDP was $8,301. As of the 2010 ACS, about 12.0% of families and 38.0% of the population were below the poverty line, including 28.8% of those under age 18 and 0.0% of those age 65 or over. It is also the home of many farms and primarily known because it is home to Campbell University.

Colleges and universities
 Campbell University

Notable people
James Archibald Campbell, founded Campbell University (originally Buies Creek Academy) in 1887
Paul Green, Pulitzer Prize-winning playwright
Robert Burren Morgan, United States senator
Rhett & Link, comedy duo and hosts of Good Mythical Morning
Woody Upchurch, former Major League Baseball pitcher
Norman Adrian Wiggins, academic, university president

References

External links
Campbell University

Census-designated places in Harnett County, North Carolina
Census-designated places in North Carolina
Unincorporated communities in North Carolina